The Men's 400 metre freestyle competition of the 2018 FINA World Swimming Championships (25 m) were held on 11 December 2018.

Records
Prior to the competition, the existing world and championship records were as follows.

The following records were established during the competition:

Results

Heats
The heats were started at 09:30.

Final
The final was held at 19:00.

References

Men's 400 metre freestyle